Candidate for President of Russia – people officially registered as a candidate for President of the Russian Federation. From them: one — 6 times, two — 4 times, one — 3 times and three — 2 times.  

Recently at the moment the election were in 2018, eight candidates participated in them. The next election will be held in 2024.

1991
According to the in force at the time Constitution, the President is elected together with the Vice President for five years.

Since 1996
According to the new Constitution, the position of Vice President was abolished, and the President is elected for a six years (until 2012 for a four years).

Facts
Only once, to determine the winner needed to carry out the second round. In the 1996 election . 
Candidates from the Communist Party has always taken second place.
Most often participated in the elections Vladimir Zhirinovsky (6 times).
Only 3 women have been presidential candidates: Ella Pamfilova in 2000, Irina Khakamada in 2004 and Ksenia Sobchak in 2018.
The largest number of candidates for the President of Russia – 11 people in 2000. The smallest number – 4 people in 2008.
The youngest presidential candidate is Ksenia Sobchak (aged 36), the oldest is Vladimir Zhirinovsky (aged 71). Both participated in the 2018 election.

See also

President of Russia
List of presidents of Russia
Elections in Russia
Russian presidential elections
List of Russian presidential candidates by number of votes received

References